The Citizen's Force Movement (MFC) was a political party in Paraguay. The party contested the 2003 general elections, receiving 0.5% of the vote for the Senate and Chamber of Deputies but failing to win a seat.

References

Defunct political parties in Paraguay